Matt Williams (born 16 March 1998) is an English rugby union player who plays for London Irish in the Premiership Rugby.

References

External links
London Irish Profile
ESPN Profile
Ultimate Rugby Profile

Living people
1998 births
English rugby union players
Rugby union centres